Lakhisarai district is one of the thirty-eight districts of Bihar state, India, and Lakhisarai town is the administrative headquarters of this district. Lakhisarai district is a part of Munger Division.

History
On 3 July 1994 this district was carved out from Munger district, which comprised the erstwhile Lakhisarai sub-division of the undivided district.

Geography

Economy
In 2006 the Ministry of Panchayati Raj named Lakhisarai one of the country's 250 districts (out of a total of 640). It is one of the 36 districts in Bihar currently receiving funds from the Backward Regions Grant Fund Programme (BRGF).

Industrial background; there are various fertilizer and pesticide factories in the district, including Bihar Mineral Industries. The market for fabrics in the district also flourishes with many old and new shops, and there are many factories like Sindur.

National Thermal Power Corporation Limited and Bihar State Power Generation Company Ltd has signed Memorandum of Understanding to set up 1320MW thermal power plant in Kajra.

Divisions

The district consists only one sub-division Lakhisarai, which is divided into Seven developmental blocks, namely, Lakhisarai, Surajgarha, Barahiya, Halsi, Pipariya, Ramgarh Chowk and Chanan.

The district headquarters Lakhisarai is a city with mixed population, the majority being the upper-caste (Bhumihaar-Brahmins) people. Still under the process of development, the city has one newly constructed PCC road and  a New bypass is constructed recently which gives some relaxation from traffic jams in the city . The Law and Order as well as development process is taking place during Nitish Kumar government's tenure. Also, Piribazar, Chanan police stations are naxal-prone due to their geographical layout. The city well known for its sindur (vermilion) production.

Demographics

According to the 2011 census Lakhisarai district has a population of 1,000,912,  This gives it a ranking of 445th in India (out of a total of 640). Its population growth rate over the decade 2001-2011 was 24.74%. Lakhisarai has a sex ratio of 900 females for every 1000 males, and a literacy rate of 64.95%. 14.29% of the population lives in urban areas. Scheduled Castes and Scheduled Tribes made up 15.31% and 0.83% of the population respectively.

At the time of the 2011 Census of India, 46.96% of the population in the district spoke Magahi, 29.09% Hindi and 1.73% Urdu as their first language. 21.17% of the population recorded a language classified as 'Others' under Hindi on the census. The main languages are Magahi and Angika, but both are counted as Hindi under the census.

Politics 
  

|}

Notable towns
 
 
Barahiya
Lakhisarai
Surajgarha

Notable villages
 
 
Balgudar
Bhaluee
Maheshpur
Nijai
Pokhrama
Sabikpur
Siswan
singarpur

Notable people 

Giriraj Singh, Minister of Rural Development

See also 

 Patna
 Culture of Magadh Region

External links 
 Official website
 Lakhisarai Information Portal

References

 
Munger division
Districts of Bihar
1994 establishments in Bihar